St. Andrews (Gaelic: Cill Rìbhinn) is a rural suburban community in the Canadian province of Nova Scotia, in Antigonish County. It is situated a fifteen minutes' drive from the Town of Antigonish in an area of rural hilly terrain. The community has grown in recent years and has a reputation for its cooperative community spirit, and was recognized for its character by a 2009 Lieutenant Governor's Community Spirit Award. Community effort has resulted in the addition of several new facilities including a curling rink, seniors complex, community centre, and numerous other projects.

Services 

There is a post office, small elementary school with playground equipment, a baseball field, a soccer field, and a pond (for hockey and skating in the winter). A curling rink that hosts several leagues, competitions and events. Community center, walking trail, volunteer fire department, Roman Catholic church.

Businesses 
St. Andrews boasts MacDonald's Convenience, a convenience store with both gas pumps and an NSLC. The Bergengren Credit Union has a branch in St. Andrews as well.

Homes and housing 
There is a seniors home in the community, a subdivision began around the year 2000, and a new one started in 2013. There are farms of varying sizes and types, but the majority of homes are old farmhouses converted into family homes with lots of property.

References 
"By Their Own Hands"  St. Andrews, Nova Scotia, Canada.  (22 min. video) By pooling resources, ideas, and talents, St. Andrews citizens have been able to build a variety of new infrastructure and community services. See:  https://coady.stfx.ca/by-their-own-hands

Communities in Antigonish County, Nova Scotia
General Service Areas in Nova Scotia